The America East men's soccer tournament (formerly known as the North Atlantic Conference championship) is the conference championship tournament in soccer for the America East Conference.  The tournament has been held every year since 1988. It is a single-elimination tournament and seeding is based on regular season records. The winner, declared conference champion, receives the conference's automatic bid to the NCAA Division I men's soccer championship.

Winners 

The following is a list of A-East tournament winners:

Key

Finals

Tournament Championships by School 

†Former member of the America East

Notes

References

External links 
 
 America East Men's Soccer Record Book